Vera Helena Bonetti Mossa (born ) is a retired Brazilian female volleyball player. She was part of the Brazil women's national volleyball team at the 1980 Summer Olympics and 1988 Summer Olympics. She also competed at the 1986 FIVB Volleyball Women's World Championship.

Biography
Mossa started playing volleyball when she was eight years old, supported by her parents, both physical education teachers. In 1979, when she was 15 years old, she was drafted for the Brazilian national volleyball team playing the 1980 Summer Olympics.

She played for the clubs Guarani (1976-1980), CA Pirelli (1981-1982), Supergasbras (1983-1989; with which she won the 1984/85 and 1985/86 Superliga). In 1990 Mossa moved to Italy, playing for Despar Perugia and Volley Sumirago. Back to Brazil, she played for Recra/Trasmontano (1995–97), Pinheiros (1998), Guarulhos (1999) and Minas Tênis (2000), where she finished her career.

Personal life
After retiring from volleyball, Mossa became an entrepreneur and opened several businesses in the city of Campinas.

She married then volleyball player and current coach Bernardo Rezende (Bernardinho), from 1985 to 1994. From that relationship she had the future volleyball player Bruno Rezende. Currently she is in her third marriage.

Mossa participated of the 1985 film Rock Estrela, directed by Lael Rodrigues.

References

External links
 

1964 births
Living people
Brazilian women's volleyball players
Place of birth missing (living people)
Olympic volleyball players of Brazil
Volleyball players at the 1988 Summer Olympics
Volleyball players at the 1984 Summer Olympics
Volleyball players at the 1980 Summer Olympics
Sportspeople from São Paulo (state)